Shabnam Rezaei is a Kids TV show creator, director, producer and co-founder of Big Bad Boo Studios and VOD service Oznoz. She is the director and producer of Hulu Original series The Bravest Knight, the first children's series with an LGBTQ protagonist. The all-star cast includes T. R. Knight, Bobby Moynihan, Storm Reid, RuPaul, Wanda Sykes, Wilson Cruz, and Christine Baranski. The Bravest Knight won the 2020 GLAAD Media Award for Outstanding Kids and Family Programming. 

In 2019, Rezaei directed the short film Balloon Girl, which was a finalist in the PBS Online Film Fest. Set in Stadtpark, Vienna, the short film was part of the worldwide, London-based Hope Works Project, a series of short films to inspire kindness, understanding and hope in children around the world.   

Rezaei is the creator of the animated preschool series 16 Hudson, which features a family with two dads, and families from various backgrounds such as Ireland, India, China and Iran. The series is based on Lili & Lola a mini-series created by Rezaei in 2015.  16 Hudson currently airs on TVOKids, Ici Radio-Canada Télé, Knowledge Network, Amazon Prime Video, Discovery Kids, TFO, Oznoz, Vme Kids, and Rádio e Televisão de Portugal with Season 2 introducing a refugee family. 

16 Hudson won the Mipcom Diversify TV Award in 2021 in Cannes, France, beating out Disney Junior's Mira, Royal Detective  and the Cbeebie's JoJo & Gran Gran in the Preschool category.  In 2022, Lili & Lola was nominated for the Mipcom Diversify TV Award in the Preschool category.

Career

Rezaei created and produced 1001 Nights, an animated children's series based on stories from One Thousand and One Nights. Every episode opens with the famous storyteller Shahrzad, King Shahryar, and kids Donyazad and Shahzaman. The series won three Leo Awards for Best Animation Program or Series, Best Screenwriting in an Animation Program or Series, and Best Overall Sound in an Animation Program or Series.

Her first television series, Mixed Nutz, promotes diversity and multiculturalism through a group of friends from Iran, Korea, Cuba, Austria, and India. The series was a continuation of their work Babak and Friends, and included the voice talents of Shohreh Aghdashloo, Parviz Sayyad, Ali Pourtash, and Catherine Bell.

Her directorial work includes 16 Hudson, Lili & Lola,1001 Nights, and Mixed Nutz. 

Rezaei is also the creator of Persian cultural online magazine Persian Mirror.

Personal life
Shabnam was born in Tehran, Iran and grew up in Vienna, Austria, where she attended the American International School of Vienna. She studied Computer Science Engineering and German Literature at the University of Pennsylvania in Philadelphia. She later obtained an MBA from the New York University Stern School of Business. She speaks five languages.

Filmography

Television

References

External links
 
 Big Bad Boo Studios
 Persian Mirror

Living people
21st-century American writers
American people of Iranian descent
Canadian people of Iranian descent
American women screenwriters
American television directors
American television producers
American television writers
Place of birth missing (living people)
Year of birth missing (living people)
LGBT producers
Showrunners
American women television writers
21st-century American women writers
American women television producers
American women television directors